The 1982 Avon Championships of Seattle  was a women's tennis tournament played on indoor carpet courts at the Seattle Center Coliseum  in Seattle, Washington in the United States that was part of the 1982 Avon Championships Circuit. It was the sixth and last edition of the tournament and was held from January 18 through January 25, 1982. First-seeded Martina Navratilova won the singles title and earned $30,000 first-prize money.

Finals

Singles
 Martina Navratilova defeated  Andrea Jaeger 6–2, 6–0
 It was Navratilova's 2nd singles title of the year and the 57th of her career.

Doubles
 Rosie Casals /  Wendy Turnbull defeated  Kathy Jordan /  Anne Smith 7–5, 6–4

Prize money

References

External links
 International Tennis Federation (ITF) tournament edition details

Avon Championships of Seattle
Virginia Slims of Seattle
Virginia Slims of Seattle
Virginia Slims of Seattle
Tennis in Washington (state)